Autocharis carnosalis is a species of moth of the family Crambidae. It was described by Max Saalmüller in 1880 and is found in northern Madagascar.

It has a wingspan of about 22 mm.

References

Odontiinae
Moths described in 1880
Moths of Madagascar
Moths of Africa